Enough Is Enough is the fifth studio album by Billy Squier, released on September 27, 1986. It was the first album to be released under his second seven-year Capitol Records recording contract.

The disc peaked at #61 on the Billboard album chart and included the minor hit "Love Is the Hero" which featured Freddie Mercury on backing vocals. Despite mostly positive critical reception, Enough Is Enough was a commercial disappointment and sold about 300,000 copies in the United States, making it his first album since 1980's The Tale of the Tape to not reach platinum status.

Track listing
 "Shot o' Love" (Danny Kortchmar, Squier) - 4:06
 "Love Is the Hero" (Squier) - 4:49
 "Lady with a Tenor Sax" (Freddie Mercury, Squier) - 4:24
 "All We Have to Give" (Squier) - 5:18
 "Come Home"  (Bobby Chouinard, Squier) - 3:55
 "Break the Silence" (Squier) - 4:59
 "Powerhouse"  (Squier) - 4:18
 "Lonely One" (Squier) - 4:16
 "Til It's Over" (Squier) - 6:06
 "Wink of an Eye" (Squier) - 4:54

Personnel
Billy Squier - vocals, guitars, synthesizers, multiple instruments, arrangements, mixing
Jeff Golub - guitars
Robin Jeffrey - guitars
Jeff Bova - keyboards
David Frank - keyboards, synthesizers, arrangements
Andy Richards - keyboards
Alan St. John - keyboards, synthesizers, backing vocals
T.M. Stevens - bass
Jimmy Bralower - drums, drum programming
Bobby Chouinard - drums
Steve Ferrone - drums on track 8
Jody Linscott - percussion
Freddie Mercury - vocals on track 2, arrangements on track 3
Mitch Weissman - backing vocals

Production
Peter Collins - producer, arrangements
Jimbo "James" Barton - engineer
Steve Boyer, Paul Wright - assistant engineers
Brian Gulland - arrangements, sound recording
David Thoener - mixing
Tim Leitner - mixing assistant
George Marino - mastering

References

1986 albums
Billy Squier albums
Albums produced by Peter Collins (record producer)
Capitol Records albums